Neha Bhasin (born 18 November 1982) is an Indian singer and songwriter. She is known for her playback work in Bollywood, Tollywood, Kollywood and independent songs in the genre of Indian pop and punjabi folk music. Bhasin has received seven Filmfare nominations across different languages and won two Filmfare Awards for her songs ‘‘Jag Ghoomeya’’ (Hindi) and ‘‘Paani Ravi Da’’ (Punjabi).

Early life
Neha Bhasin was born in Delhi to father Ashok Bhasin and mother Rekha Bhasin. Neha belongs to a Hindu Punjabi family. Her clan is Khukrain Bhasin which belongs to Khatri Punjabi community and originally hails from Rawalpindi District. 
Neha has two siblings, An elder sister Rashi Bhasin and younger brother Anubhav Bhasin.
She completed her schooling from Frank Anthony Public School. Neha won her first ever singing competition award, Mariah Carey's song Hero at the age of 9. Since she was a child, always aspired to become a popstar. She joined Shiamak Davar's dance academy to learn various dance forms. She also took vocal classical training from Ustad Ghulam Mustafa Khan.

Neha became an over night sensation at age 18 when she was selected by Coke V popstars, a nationwide talent search conducted by Channel V to be a part of the 5-girl pop group Viva.

Personal life
Neha Bhasin married Sameer Uddin, a music composer, in a western wedding in Tuscany, Italy on October 23, 2016.

Career
Bhasin was attending Lady Sri Ram College when she auditioned for Coke [V] Popstars in 2002 and won the competition to form India's first all-girls Viva (band) along with four other girls.

After the band broke up in 2004, Neha went on to sing for Bollywood films and Tamil film music industry.

Her first breakthrough in Bollywood was the song 'Kuch Khass Hai' in 2007 which also got Neha her first Filmfare nomination in 2008. Neha's debut Tamil song 'Pesugiren Pesugiren' composed by Yuvan Shankar Raja won her the Vijay Award for Best Female Playback Singer in 2008.

In 2021, Bhasin featured on Times Square Billboard as artist of the month on Spotify for her song ‘Oot Patangi’.

Awards

International collaborations
  Neha collaborated with Malaysian Hip Hop star Emcee Jesz for the song "THANIYE". The song has over 300,000 views on YouTube alone. It was also nominated for "Best Collaboration" at the RADIO RAGA AWARDS in Malaysia (2008–09).

TV and film
  Bhasin made her acting debut starring in the film Life Ki Toh Lag Gayi. She starred alongside Kay Kay Menon and Ranvir Shorey in the movie which released in 2012.
 Neha hosted Sa Re Ga Ma Hungama on Zee Music in 2008 (backstage hosting).
 Neha played the role of an anchor and judge on the musical reality show Sitaaron Ko Choona Hai that aired on Real TV.
 Neha was a wildcard entry on Jhalak Dikhla Jaa Season 5.
 Neha was a contestant on Bigg Boss OTT in 2021 and got evicted on Day 39.
 Neha was a wildcard contestant on Bigg Boss 15 in 2021. She entered on Day 35 and was evicted on Day 55.

Film songs

Television

References

External links 

 
 Neha Bhasin at IMDb

Living people
21st-century Indian women singers
Bollywood playback singers
Telugu playback singers
Indian women playback singers
Indian women pop singers
21st-century Indian singers
1982 births
Filmfare Awards winners
Zee Cine Awards winners
Singers from Delhi
Women musicians from Delhi
Bigg Boss (Hindi TV series) contestants
South Indian International Movie Awards winners